Coleophora eurasiatica is a moth of the family Coleophoridae. It is found in Hungary, southern Russia, China and Korea. It occurs in steppe biotopes.

The wingspan is 8–10 mm. The forewing colour consists of various shades of ochre, darker towards the costa and lighter towards the dorsal margin. There is a strong white costal streak from the base to three-fourths. The hindwings are light pearl-grey. Adults are on wing in June.

The larvae feed on the leaves of Kochia proslata.

References

eurasiatica
Moths described in 1989
Moths of Europe
Moths of Asia